Hart's Mill is a former flour mill complex located on a bend in the Port River, in the north-western corner of Port Adelaide, South Australia. Now partially restored, it has become the suburb's cultural hub.

It has been listed as a state heritage place on the South Australian Heritage Register since 27 May 2004. Its significance is described as follows:Built c. 1889, this substantial mill building is associated with the development of the wheat industry in South Australia in the latter part of the 19th century and specifically with the export of flour from the state through Port Adelaide. It is a rare example of a purpose-built late 19th century flour mill in South Australia, and when considered with the adjacent 1855 Hart's Mill, provides the only known example of two generations of flour mill buildings surviving on one site. The Packing Shed is an uncommon surviving example of an ancillary milling industry building. (HB Assessment Report 12/03)

Background 

After his final voyage to England in 1846 John Hart settled near Port Adelaide, where he joined with H. Kent Hughes as merchants Hughes and Hart then, as Hart & Company, established large and successful flour mills. The flour mill at Port Adelaide, now colloquially referred to as Hart's Mill, was regarded as one of the best, and "Hart's Flour" commanded the highest prices in Australia.

John Hart & Co. merged with the Adelaide Milling Co. in 1882.

References

External links 
South Australian History Hub - Hart's Mill complex
Hart's Mill Project
Out Port - Hart's Mill

Buildings and structures in Adelaide
South Australian Heritage Register